Animal furniture refers both to furniture used by animals and to furniture made from animals.

Furniture for animals

Known as "pet furniture", furniture designed for use by animals became a popular trend in the early 21st century.  Typical pieces include pet beds, doghouses, hammocks, dog coolers, cat trees, parrot tents and extravagant play equipment.  

In 2008, James Stephenson and Jason R. Rich cited high-end furniture for cats and dogs as one of the best categories of products to buy and sell for big profits.  Home-crafted furniture for pets has also become popular.

Stylish and modern pet furniture that is part of the home decor has become increasingly popular over the years, with certain pet furniture-specific brands like Hepper creating functional pieces of home decor.

Furniture made from animals

Animal furniture also refers to furniture made from animals.  Such furniture became popular during the Victorian era.  In 1896, William G. Fitzgerald wrote an article titled "Animal Furniture" in The Strand Magazine. The article included a photographic gallery of unusual pieces from the era, including a liquor stand made from an elephant's foot, a door stop made from an ostrich foot, a candelabra made from a monkey, lamps made from a black swan, an emu, monkeys, and a black bear, a chair made from a baby giraffe (with neck and head rising from the back, a porter's chair made out of a baby elephant, and a "tiger chair"  with the seat covered in the animal's skin, the tail coiled around the edge, and "the head and paws ... arranged so as to give the impression that the terrible animal is about to spring."  In a 1907 book on big game hunting in Ceylon, Harry Storey described his practices of making furniture out of elephant parts:"Of trophies to be secured from our elephants the feet rank first . . . They make fine footstools, liquor stands, or, if cut long in the leg, umbrella stands.

In his book, "Empire and the Animal Body," John Miller wrote that the animal furniture made from exotic animals from throughout the British Empire became "hyperbolically domesticated metropolitan accessories that testify to imperial power through their extraordinary, and sometimes comic, ingenuity.

Victorian furniture made from animals is sometimes referred to as "Wardian furniture," derived from the name of the noted taxidermist, Rowland Ward.  One author noted:"As a result of the work of Rowland Ward, there was a craze in the Victorian era for furniture and other decorative items made from the parts of animals.  His were so popular that he got the unofficial naming rights: 'Wardian furniture' was the name generally given to any such object ..."

References

Furniture